Wish You Were Here is the second studio album of American country music artist Mark Wills. Released on May 5, 1998, on Mercury Nashville Records, the album produced four singles on the Billboard Hot Country Singles & Tracks (now Hot Country Songs) charts, all of which made top 10: "I Do (Cherish You)", "Don't Laugh at Me", "Wish You Were Here", and "She's in Love". The album itself peaked at #8 on the Billboard Top Country Albums charts and #74 on The Billboard 200. It also received RIAA platinum certification for U.S. sales of one million copies.

The title track, which was the third release, became Wills's first Number One hit on the country charts in mid-1999. "I Do (Cherish You)" was later covered by 98 Degrees on their album 98 Degrees and Rising, from which it was also released as a single.

Track listing

Personnel
Mark Wills – lead vocals, backing vocals (tracks 1, 4)
Eddie Bayers – drums
Dan Dugmore – lap steel guitar
Paul Franklin – pedal steel guitar
Aubrey Haynie— fiddle, mandolin
Brent Mason – electric guitar
Gary Prim – keyboards
John Wesley Ryles – backing vocals
John D. Willis – acoustic guitar, gut string guitar
Glenn Worf – bass guitar

Charts

Weekly charts

Year-end charts

References

1998 albums
Mercury Nashville albums
Mark Wills albums
Albums produced by Carson Chamberlain